Luis Raúl Quiñones Torruellas (born April 28, 1962, in Ponce, Puerto Rico) is a former utility infielder in Major League Baseball and current hitting coach for the Batavia Muckdogs, Short-Season Single-A affiliate of the Miami Marlins. From 1983 through 1992, Quiñones played for the Oakland Athletics (1983), San Francisco Giants (1986), Chicago Cubs (1987), Cincinnati Reds (1988–91) and Minnesota Twins (1992). He was a switch-hitter and threw right-handed. He received American League Player of the Week honors for the week beginning September 3, 1989.

Luis was a member of the Cincinnati Reds 1990 World Series Championship team. He drove in what would be the winning run in Game 6 of the 1990 NLCS, a 2–1 Reds victory and the National League pennant.

After spending the 2009 season as the hitting coach for the Oneonta Tigers, he was promoted by the Detroit Tigers to the same position with the West Michigan Whitecaps of the Midwest League.

In an eight-season career, Quiñones posted a .226 batting average with 19 home runs and 106 RBI in 442 games played.

References

External links

1962 births
Living people
Albany A's players
Amarillo Gold Sox players
Atlantic City Surf players
Calgary Cannons players
Chicago Cubs players
Cincinnati Reds players
Grays Harbor Loggers players
Iowa Cubs players
Jacksonville Suns players
Leones de Yucatán players
Maine Guides players
Major League Baseball players from Puerto Rico
Major League Baseball second basemen
Major League Baseball shortstops
Major League Baseball third basemen
Minnesota Twins players
Minor league baseball coaches
Nashville Sounds players
Oakland Athletics players
Phoenix Firebirds players
Phoenix Giants players
Portland Beavers players
Puerto Rican expatriate baseball players in Canada
Puerto Rican expatriate baseball players in Mexico
Salem Redbirds players
San Francisco Giants players
Sportspeople from Ponce, Puerto Rico
Tacoma Tigers players
Tucson Toros players